The Global Partnership for Effective Development Co-operation (GPEDC), formed in 2012, is an association of governments and organisations that seeks to improve practices of international development. It has a unique position due to the breadth and stature of its participants (in 2021 about 161 countries and 56 major organisations concerned with development).

The creation of GPEDC was mandated by the 2011 Busan High Level Forum on Aid Effectiveness, the fourth and last in a series of such forums held between 2003 and 2011. The purpose was to carry forward an "effective development co-operation" agenda, superseding the previous "aid effectiveness" movement. After the creation of the international Sustainable Development Goals in 2015, GPEDC aligned its mandate to the 2030 Agenda for Sustainable Development. GPEDC's monitoring exercises in 2016 and 2018 showed mixed success in advancing its endorsed practices of effective development co-operation. A notable disappointment has been lack of full participation by China and India.

Organisation

Participants 
GPEDC does not have a formal membership system but says (as of 2021) it "brings together 161 countries and 56 organizations".

Governance 
GPEDC's key governance institutions are: a Steering Committee which meets twice a year; a Joint Support Group, hosted jointly by OECD and UNDP, which carries on GPEDC work between meetings of the Steering Committee; four Co-Chairs who chair the Steering Committee and provide guidance the JSG; and periodic High-Level Meetings where representatives of all primary stakeholders can take part.

Funding 
Funding for the administration of GPEDC has been provided by at least 20 governments.

Vision 
The stated vision of GPEDC is: "to maximise the effectiveness of all forms of co-operation for development for the shared benefits of people, planet, prosperity and peace".

Principles 
GPEDC espouses four principles for development co-operation:

 country ownership over the development process,
 a focus on results,
 inclusive development partnerships
 transparency and accountability.

History

Beginnings 
The creation of GPEDC was mandated by the 2011 Busan High Level Forum (HLF) on Aid Effectiveness. This meeting was the fourth and last in a series of high-level aid effectiveness forums held between 2003 and 2011, which had mainly focused on the aid relationship between the government donors of developed countries and the governments of recipient countries, with close involvement also from the large multilateral aid agencies (European Union institutions, United Nations agencies, development banks etc.). The Busan forum saw a need to embrace a wider and more complicated set of actors and relationships in international development processes. The forum's final declaration – "Busan Partnership for Effective Development Co-operation" – may be regarded as GPEDC's founding document. It particularly recognised the importance of relationships between developing countries (South-South co-operation) and welcomed a broader range of non-governmental actors: "private sector" or profit-making bodies as well as more purely socially- and environmentally-purposed ("civil society") organisations. It sketched a road-map wherein the existing OECD Working Party on Aid Effectiveness (WP-EFF) would hand over to a GPEDC directorate in 2012, with a support team provided jointly by the OECD and UNDP.

The WF-EFF formally finished its work at the end of June 2012, reaching more detailed agreement on the mandate and working arrangements for GPEDC, as well as the indicators, targets and monitoring frameworks it was initially to use. It put in place a process to select a GPEDC Steering Committee including three co-chairs. The co-chairs that emerged were Justine Greening, Armida Alisjahbana, and Ngozi Okonjo-Iweala: government ministers of, respectively, the UK, Indonesia and Nigeria. The co-chairs met in October, and the first full meeting of the Steering Committee took place in December of that year. The Steering Committee supervised continuation of the work of crystallizing and monitoring the progress indicators, and prepared for GPEDC's first high-level meeting.

First High Level Meeting, Mexico, 2014 
GPEDC's first high-level meeting was held in Mexico in April 2014. The meeting was well-attended and lively, largely dispelling prior fears that GPEDC was in danger of fading away. The wide range of participants gave some credibility to GPEDC's ambition to be a more inclusive global partnership than its precursor, but the absence of official representation by China, and tepid or ambivalent participation by India, South Africa and Brazil, weakened attempts to focus on the roles of middle-income countries (MICs) and South-South co-operation. Some felt the process and agenda was still too much dominated by the OECD and its rich-world member states. Despite UNDP's role in the organisation and a visible presence of United Nations institutions at the meeting, there were worries that GPEDC was detracting from - or insufficiently integrated with - the UN's Development Co-operation Forum, and the UN-led process of developing the Post-2015 Development Agenda.

Little was changed from the range of concerns already established and discussed at Busan in 2011, yet the framework for monitoring progress on the commitments of the Aid Effectiveness agenda had been weakened, and the new results and accountability framework of GPEDC was also weak.

Progress indicators and results, 2010-2015 
Having been created to pursue the commitments of the 2011 Busan forum, GPEDC attempted to distill these commitments into a set of indicators and targets for monitoring and assessing progress. The first monitoring cycle was projected to run from 2010 to 2015, following on from the monitoring of the Paris Declaration on Aid Effectiveness, which had taken place from 2005 to 2010. However, for GPEDC it was more difficult to devise a limited number of suitable indicators because its participants were more numerous, various and changeable. The process of devising, testing and agreeing the details of the indicators took years. Although an initial draft was agreed in June 2012, the indicators were still not definitively finalized by 2016 when it was time to report on the cycle. Accordingly, some baselines were late or missing, and some targets were inapplicable or largely irrelevant. The following table summarises the results reported by GPEDC in 2016.

Second High-Level Meeting, Nairobi 2016 

At the second High-Level Meeting, at Nairobi in 2016, the participants formally affirmed and clarified GPECD's relevance under the 2030 Agenda for Sustainable Development (the Sustainable Development Goals having replaced the Millennium Development Goals the previous year). GPEDC reframed its mandate in terms of contributing to the 2030 Agenda, and pledged to report to the UN High-Level Political Forum on Sustainable Development (HLPF) on its contributions in this regard, especially regarding the monitoring of SDG Goal 17 Indicator 16.

The outcome document also affirmed the importance of GPEDC's monitoring framework, acknowledged a need to "refine" it, and annexed a summary of the 2016 findings, but was later criticised for not sufficiently upholding the principle of adhering to clear and time-bound commitments.

The meeting was attended by over four thousand people from more than 150 countries, but very few government ministers. The BRICS countries were even more sparsely represented than in the 2014 Mexico meeting. Signs were visible in the outcome document that GPEDC had given up trying to accommodate these countries with a separate role – involving clear differentiated commitments – for Southern providers of development cooperation.

Later history 
A further monitoring round took place in 2018, incorporating the same indicators as previously, though without reference to the 2015 targets. It showed a mixed picture of improvements and regressions. Regarding the new monitoring of SDG Indicator 17.16, it found that 45%  countries "reported progress towards inclusive, transparent and accountable multi-stakeholder partnerships". The 2018 monitoring round revealed significant progress among participants in strengthening national development planning, and that overall mutual accountability mechanisms in developing countries are becoming more inclusive. However, the monitoring results highlighted a decline in donor countries’ alignment to developing countries’ priorities and results frameworks; moreover, the forward visibility of development cooperation was decreasing. Civil society organisations were also found to be experiencing a deterioration in the conditions and overall environment for them to operate and contribute to development. The report suggested that improving the quality of public-private dialogue in developing countries required increased capacity, strengthened relevance and the inclusion of a wide range of private sector actors.

A "Senior Level Meeting" of GPEDC was held in the margins of an HLPF meeting in New York, July 2019. It celebrated GPEDC's creation of a Knowledge Sharing Platform and compendium of good practices, and also the establishment of a Business Leaders' Caucus and a set of "Principles for Effective Private Sector Engagement" (the "Kampala Principles"). The co-chairs acknowledged the "mixed picture" of the monitoring results and "lack of progress in the 'unfinished business' agenda" (i.e. meeting the commitments made by the 2005 Paris Declaration and subsequent high-level meetings). They encouraged proposals for reviewing GPEDC's monitoring function, and creating a Global Action Plan in time for the Third High Level Meeting.

In May 2020, the Steering Committee launched a Work Plan for  2020-2022 (the period leading up to the envisaged Third High Level Meeting of GPEDC, and the mid-point review of the 2015-2030 Sustainable Development effort). The Work Plan has three main priorities: to demonstrate that the effectiveness principles really produce an impact; to deepen the practice of "partnerships"; and to reform GPEDC's monitoring processes. The last of these means that GPEDC monitoring is suspended for 2020-2022 while a new framework is developed with a view to adoption at the 2022 High Level Meeting.

References 

International development
2012 establishments